The Torre Planetarium is a two-tower skyscraper in the design development stage located in Panama City. Both buildings will have two levels of basements.

See also
List of tallest buildings in Panama City

References

External links
Official website

Proposed buildings and structures in Panama
Residential skyscrapers in Panama City